Claudio Coello (2 March 1642 – 20 April 1693) was a Spanish Baroque painter. Coello is considered the last great Spanish painter of the 17th century.

The son of Faustino Coello, a famous Portuguese sculptor, he was a court painter for Charles II. He worked on many churches and public buildings in Madrid, with his most famous work being in the sacristy of El Escorial, which is filled with portraits of priests and courtiers.

Life and work
Claudio Coello was of Portuguese parents, but was born at Madrid in 1642. He was there instructed in the art by Francisco Rizi, and executed while yet in that school an altar-piece for San Plácido at Madrid. His acquaintance with the court painter, Juan Carreño de Miranda, procured him the permission to visit the royal collection, where he made his greatest advance by studying the works of Titian, Rubens, and van Dyck. His friendship with José Jiménez Donoso, under whom he studied at Rome, was not less advantageous for him. In conjunction with that artist he painted frescoes at Madrid and Toledo, and executed the Triumphal Arch for the entrance of the Queen, Maria Louisa of Orleans. By these paintings he became well known, and was employed by the Archbishop of Saragossa in 1683. He was made painter to Charles II, by whom he was employed in the Escorial.Coello was the last Spanish painter of eminence for some years, as from the time that Luca Giordano was summoned to Spain, the art sank gradually to its decay. Many excellent examples of his work are to be seen in the churches and convents in Madrid, Saragossa, and Salamanca. But his principal work is the famous altar-piece in the sacristy of San Lorenzo, in the Escorial, representing the 'Adoration of the Miraculous Host.' It is an immense composition, and occupied the painter seven years.

In the crowd of personages that form the procession, are no less than fifty portraits, including those of the king and the principal persons of the court: it is painted with the utmost precision, yet in a bold and masterly style, and there is a majestic solemnity in the arrangement of the whole, which suits well to the grandeur of the subject. It is a very extraordinary performance, and holds its place even by the side of the works of Titian and Rubens. The preference which was given to Luca Giordano, who came to Madrid in 1692, in painting the grand staircase in the Escorial, mortified Coello so much that he died of vexation at Madrid in 1693.

Coello etched three plates, viz. : — 'Christ on the Cross, with the Virgin, St. Augustine, and St. Monica,' and the portraits of Charles II and his Mother. He was the instructor of Sebastián Muñoz and Teodoro Ardmans.

Selected works
Budapest Gallery. St. Joseph with the Virgin and Child.
Madrid. S. Placido. An altar-piece.
Madrid, Palace. Cartoons, representing the Fable of Cupid and Psyche, painted by Ant. Palomino.
Madrid, Museum. Assumption of the Virgin (Two), Portrait of Charles II. of Spain, St. Rosa of Lima, and The Apotheosis of St. Augustin.
Munich. Gallery. St. Peter of Alcantara.
Petersburg. Hermitage. His own Portrait and The Magdalen.
Saragossa. Augustinian Church. The frescoes in the cupola.
Madrid (province). El Escorial. The Adoration of the Host. (His chef-d'oeuvre.)
Saint Catherine of Alexandria Dominating the Emperor Maxentius

Gallery

References

External links

Claudio Coello on Artcyclopedia

1642 births
1693 deaths
Spanish Baroque painters
17th-century Spanish painters
Spanish male painters
Spanish people of Portuguese descent
Artists from Madrid
Court painters
Catholic painters